The Table Mountain Challenge is a 37 km mountain trail run annually clockwise around Table Mountain and Devil's Peak, South Africa and consisting mostly of single track with a few kilometers of jeep track.  The trail involves a great amount of scrambling, passing through an indigenous forest and crossing mountain streams, steep slopes of fynbos and views.

The route starts at Kloof Nek, runs below Tafelberg Road via Deer Park to the path below the Blockhouse on Devil's Peak. From there a contour path leads to Constantia Nek, passing above Kirstenbosch, cutting through Orange Kloof to Myburgs Path, on to Suikerbossie and up Llandudno Corner, over the top of the Twelve Apostles to Kasteelspoort, down the Pipe Track and back to Kloof Nek.

Winners
In September 2010 the men's winner was Bruce Arnett in a time of 3h48m12s and the ladies' winner Katya Soggot  in 4h31m12s.

Anna Frost from New Zealand won the 2011 women's race in 4h11m9s, while Kílian Jornet Burgada from Spain won the men's race in 3h41m47s.

References

External links
 Map

Mountain running competitions
Sport in Cape Town
Marathons in South Africa
Athletics competitions in South Africa
Table Mountain